Dunklin County is located in the Bootheel of the U.S. state of Missouri. As of the 2020 census, the population was 28,283. The largest city and county seat is Kennett. The county was officially organized on February 14, 1845, and is named in honor of Daniel Dunklin, a Governor of Missouri who died the year before the county was organized.

Dunklin County comprises the Kennett, MO Micropolitan Statistical Area.

Geography
The lowest point in the state of Missouri is located on the St. Francis River in Buffalo Township in Dunklin County, where it flows out of Missouri and into Arkansas.

Adjacent counties

Stoddard County (north)
New Madrid County (northeast)
Pemiscot County (east)
Mississippi County, Arkansas (southeast)
Craighead County, Arkansas (south)
Greene County, Arkansas (southwest)
Clay County, Arkansas (west)
Butler County (northwest)

Demographics

As of the census of 2000, there were 33,155 people, 13,411 households, and 9,159 families residing in the county. The population density was 61 people per square mile (23/km2). There were 14,682 housing units at an average density of 27 per square mile (10/km2). The racial makeup of the county was 88.64% White, 8.68% Black or African American, 0.31% Native American, 0.27% Asian, 0.01% Pacific Islander, 1.03% from other races, and 1.06% from two or more races. Approximately 2.49% of the population were Hispanic or Latino of any race. Among the major first ancestries reported in Dunklin County were 38.8% American, 10.6% Irish, 8.2% German, and 7.5% English ancestry.

There were 13,411 households, of which 31.30% had children under the age of 18 living with them, 51.60% were married couples living together, 13.20% had a female householder with no husband present, and 31.70% were "non-families." Of all households, 28.10% consisted of individuals and 14.00% had someone living alone who was 65 years of age or older. The average household size was 2.42 and the average family size was 2.94.

Of the county's population, 26.00% were under the age of 18, 8.10% were from 18 to 24, 26.00% were from 25 to 44, 23.50% were from 45 to 64, and 16.50% were 65 years of age or older. The median age was 38 years. For every 100 females there were 89.60 males. For every 100 women age 18 and over, there were 85.10 men.

The median income for a household in the county was $30,927, and the median income for a family was $38,439. Males had a median income of $27,288 versus $18,142 for females. The per capita income for the county was $16,737. About 19.40% of families and 24.50% of the population were below the poverty line, including 33.90% of those under age 18 and 21.30% of those age 65 or over. Of the state's 115 counties, in 2010 Dunklin ranked 105th in terms of poverty.

Religion
According to the Association of Religion Data Archives County Membership Report (2000), Dunklin County is a part of the Bible Belt with evangelical Protestantism being the majority religion. The most predominant denominations among residents in Dunklin County who adhere to a religion are Southern Baptists (64.11%), Methodists (8.66%), and Churches of Christ (6.74%).

2020 Census

Education
Of adults 25 years of age and older in Dunklin County, 63.7% possesses a high school diploma or higher while 9.1% hold a bachelor's degree or higher as their highest educational attainment.

Public schools
Campbell R-II School District - Campbell
Campbell Elementary School (PK-06)
Campbell High School (07-12)
Clarkton C-4 School District - Clarkton
Clarkton Elementary School (PK-06)
Clarkton High School (07-12)
Holcomb R-III School District - Holcomb
Holcomb Elementary School (PK-06)
Holcomb High School (07-12)
Kennett School District 39 - Kennett
Early Childhood Center - (PK) - Primary School
H. Byron Masterson Elementary School (K-02)
South Elementary School (03-05)
Kennett Middle School (06-08)
Kennett High School (09-12)
Malden R-I School District - Malden
Malden Elementary School (PK-06)
Malden High School (07-12)
Senath-Hornersville C-8 School District - Senath
Senath Elementary School (PK-04)
Hornersville Middle School (05-08)
Senath-Hornersville High School (09-12)
Southland C-9 School District - Cardwell
Southland Elementary School (K-06)
Southland High School (07-12)

Private schools
Kennett Christian Academy - Kennett - (K-12) - Assemblies of God/Pentecostal
St. Teresa School - Campbell - (PK-08) - Roman Catholic

Alternative and vocational schools
Bootheel State School - Clarkton - (K-12) - A school for handicapped and special need students.
Diagnostic Center - Kennett - (PK-12) - Special Education
Kennett Area Vocational School - Kennett - (09-12) - Vocational/technical

Public libraries
 Dunklin County Library
Arbyrd Community Library

Transportation

Major highways
 U.S. Route 62
 U.S. Route 412
 Route 25
 Route 53
 Route 84
 Route 153
 Route 164

Airports
Kennett Memorial Airport is a public-use airport in Dunklin County. It is located one nautical mile (1.85 km) southeast of the central business district of Kennett, which owns the airport.

Health care
The county no longer has a hospital as the Twin Rivers Regional Medical Center closed on June 11, 2018. The nearest hospital is now Pemiscot County Hospital in Hayti. The region suffers from high infant and maternal mortality rates.

Media

Radio
FM
FM 89.9 KAUF Kennett
FM 92.9 KLSC Malden
LPFM 102.5 KCJS Kennett
FM 104.3 KXOQ Kennett
FM 105.5 KBOA-FM Piggott, AR-Kennett
FM 106.5 KTMO New Madrid-Kennett
FM 107.5 KFEB Campbell

AM
AM1470 KMAL Malden
AM1540 KBOA Kennett

Print
Campbell Courier, Campbell, Missouri
Delta Dunklin Democrat, Kennett, Missouri

Television
There are no television stations in Dunklin County, Missouri. Dunklin County, Missouri is placed in the Paducah, KY, Cape Girardeau, MO, & Harrisburg, Illinois Television Market. Those stations include:
ABC- WSIL 3
NBC- WPSD 6
CBS- KFVS 12
FOX- KBSI 23
PBS- WSIU 8 & WKPD 29
MYTV- WDKA 49
 
However some residents in the south end of the county watch stations from the Memphis, TN and Jonesboro, AR Television Markets.

Politics

Local
Dunklin County was once a Democratic stronghold.  However, like the rest of Southeast Missouri and the Bootheel in particular, the county has swung Republican.  In 2020 alone, three formerly Democratic officials switched their registration to Republican, and Republicans now control a majority of elected offices.

State

In the Missouri House of Representatives, Dunklin County is divided into two legislative districts, both of which are represented by Republicans.

 District 150 – Consists of most of the county (the central and southern portions). The district includes the entire city of Kennett as well as the communities of Campbell, Clarkton, Holcomb, Senath, Hornersville, Rives, Arbyrd, and Cardwell. Andrew McDaniel, a Republican from Deering.

District 152 – Consists of the northern portion of the county and takes in the entire city of Malden. Hardy Billington, a Republican from Poplar Bluff.

In the Missouri Senate, all of Dunklin County is a part of Missouri's 25th District and is currently represented by Republican Jason Bean of Poplar Bluff.

Federal
Missouri's two U.S. Senators are Republican Josh Hawley of Columbia and Republican Roy Blunt of Strafford.

McCaskill was reelected to her second term in 2012 with 54.81 percent of the statewide vote over former Republican U.S. Representative W. Todd Akin of Town & Country and Libertarian Jonathan Dine of Riverside; Dunklin County gave McCaskill just over 50 and a half percent of the vote.

Blunt was elected to his first term in 2010 with 54.23 percent of the statewide vote over former Democratic Missouri Secretary of State Robin Carnahan, Libertarian Jonathan Dine of Riverside, and Constitutionalist Jerry Beck of Novelty; Dunklin County voters backed Blunt with just under 62 and a half percent of the vote.

All of Dunklin County is included in Missouri's 8th Congressional District and is currently represented by Republican Jason T. Smith of Salem in the U.S. House of Representatives. Smith won a special election on Tuesday, June 4, 2013, to complete the remaining term of former Republican U.S. Representative Jo Ann Emerson of Cape Girardeau. Emerson announced her resignation a month after being reelected with over 70 percent of the vote in the district. She resigned to become CEO of the National Rural Electric Cooperative.

Political culture

Historically, Dunklin County has tended to support Democrats at the presidential level. A predominantly rural county in the heavily impoverished Bootheel with a fairly substantial African American population, Democrats at all levels have historically performed quite well in Dunklin County. Bill Clinton of neighboring Arkansas was the last Democratic presidential nominee to carry the county in 1996; since then, Dunklin County has, like virtually all counties throughout the state, experienced a rapid trend rightward, as Republicans have been surging at the presidential level. Voters in Dunklin County still maintain their historically Democratic roots as Democrats hold all the local elected offices in the county, and statewide elections are much more competitive and still have a tendency to lean Democratic. Case in point: Incumbent U.S. Senator Claire McCaskill, a Democrat, carried Dunklin County by approximately five percentage points in her reelection bid for U.S. Senate in 2012 at the same time as former Governor of Massachusetts Mitt Romney, a Republican, trounced incumbent President Barack Obama by 30 points in the county.

Like most rural areas throughout Missouri, voters in Dunklin County generally adhere to socially and culturally conservative principles but are more moderate or populist on economic issues, typical of the Dixiecrat philosophy. In 2004, Missourians voted on a constitutional amendment to define marriage as the union between a man and a woman—it overwhelmingly passed Dunklin County with 87.57 percent of the vote. The initiative passed the state with 71 percent of support from voters as Missouri became the first state to ban same-sex marriage. In 2006, Missourians voted on a constitutional amendment to fund and legalize embryonic stem cell research in the state—it failed in Dunklin County with 53.70 percent voting against the measure. The initiative narrowly passed the state with 51 percent of support from voters as Missouri became one of the first states in the nation to approve embryonic stem cell research. Despite Dunklin County's longstanding tradition of supporting socially conservative platforms, voters in the county have a penchant for advancing populist causes like increasing the minimum wage. In 2006, Missourians voted on a proposition (Proposition B) to increase the minimum wage in the state to $6.50 an hour—it passed Dunklin County with 79.42 percent of the vote. The proposition strongly passed every single county in Missouri with 78.99 percent voting in favor as the minimum wage was increased to $6.50 an hour in the state. During the same election, voters in five other states also strongly approved increases in the minimum wage.

Missouri presidential preference primary (2008)

In the 2008 Missouri Presidential Preference Primary, voters in Dunklin County from both political parties supported candidates who finished in second place in the state at large and nationally.

Former U.S. Senator Hillary Clinton (D-New York) received more votes in Dunklin County, 2,587, than any candidate from either party during the 2008 Missouri Democratic presidential preference primary. The 2,587 is more votes than the total number cast in the entire Republican primary in Dunklin County.

Communities

 Arbyrd
 Arkmo
 Baird
 Brian
 Buck Donic
 Bucoda
 Campbell
 Cardwell
 Caruth
 Clarkton
 Cockrum
 Cotton Plant
 Dillman
 Europa
 Frisbee
 Gibson
 Glennonville
 Gobler
 Hargrove
 Holcomb
 Hollywood
 Hornersville
 Ipley
 Kennett (county seat)
 Mackeys
 Malden
 Marlow
 McGuire
 Nesbit
 Octa
 Providence
 Rives
 Senath
 Sumach
 Townley
 Valley Ridge
 Vincit
 White Oak
 Wilhelmina
 Wrightsville

Notable people
Sheryl Crow, Grammy-winning singer/songwriter, was born in Kennett and grew up there.
Trent Tomlinson, country music singer/songwriter, was born and raised in Kennett
David Nail, country music singer, was born and raised in Kennett.
Onie Wheeler, country music and bluegrass musician

See also
National Register of Historic Places listings in Dunklin County, Missouri

References

External links
 Digitized 1930 Plat Book of Dunklin County  from University of Missouri Division of Special Collections, Archives, and Rare Books

 
Missouri counties
1845 establishments in Missouri
Populated places established in 1845